The Self-Protect High-Energy Laser Demonstrator (SHiELD) is a directed energy weapons development program. The objective of this programme is to demonstrate the ability of a laser system mounted on aircraft. The program will develop and integrate a moderate power laser in a fighter-compatible pod. It was reported that United States Air Force is considering getting a defensive laser weapon for fifth and sixth generation fighter jets by 2021.

References

Military lasers